Dunany is a small community in Wentworth, Quebec, Canada. It is located just over an hour's drive west of Montreal in the Laurentian Mountains, some 10 to 15 kilometres north of Lachute.

Its Dunany Golf and Country Club was founded in 1922. The club consists of a 9-hole course and a clubhouse surrounded by four small lakes: Black, Curran, Clear and Boyd.

External links
 Official Site
 A history of Dunany
 Dunany Country Club

Communities in Laurentides